Mykola Maksymovych Holovko (16 April 1937 – 26 August 2004) was a Ukrainian football (soccer) player and coach. He was born in the city of Makiivka, Ukraine. As a player, he played for Shakhtar Donetsk and Lokomotyv Donetsk. He coached Kolos Starobeshevo, Shakhtar Makiivka, Kolos Ilovaisk, Mali and Illichivets Mariupol. Later worked as a coach in young school of Shakhtar Donetsk. Honorary coach of Ukraine in 1996.

Awards
 Winner of Soviet Cup: 1961, 1962
 Finalist of Soviet Cup: 1963

References

External links
 

Sportspeople from Makiivka
1937 births
2004 deaths
Soviet footballers
FC Lokomotyv Donetsk players
FC Shakhtar Donetsk players
Soviet football managers
Ukrainian football managers
Ukrainian expatriate football managers
Mali national football team managers
Expatriate football managers in Mali
FC Mariupol managers
Association football defenders